Joginder Singh Dhanaor is an Indian athlete. He won a silver medal in the 400 metres and the 4 × 400 m relay in the 1954 Asian Games.

References

Asian Games medalists in athletics (track and field)
Athletes (track and field) at the 1954 Asian Games
Asian Games silver medalists for India
Medalists at the 1954 Asian Games
Possibly living people
Year of birth missing
Indian male sprinters